Astrangia poculata, the northern star coral or northern cup coral, is a species of non-reefbuilding stony coral in the family Rhizangiidae. It is native to shallow water in the western Atlantic Ocean and the Caribbean Sea. It is also found on the western coast of Africa. The International Union for Conservation of Nature  lists this coral as being of "least concern". Astrangia poculata is an emerging model organism for corals because it harbors a facultative photosymbiosis, is a calcifying coral, and has a large geographic range. Research on this emerging model system is showcased annually by the Astrangia Research Working Group, collaboratively hosted by Roger Williams University, Boston University, and Southern Connecticut State University

Description
The individual polyps are large and sit in stony cups known as corallites. The polyps are translucent and the colony has a furry appearance when they are expanded. In warm water and with high levels of light, this coral often houses photosynthesizing symbiotic protists known as zooxanthellae in its tissues, and then the coral appears brown. In cooler, or low-light conditions, the zooxanthellae may no longer be beneficial to the coral and may be expelled, and then the coral appears pale in colour.
 and does not contain zooxanthellae.

Distribution and habitat
Astrangia poculata is native to the western Atlantic Ocean and Caribbean Sea where its range extends from Cape Cod in Massachusetts to the Gulf of Mexico. It also occurs on the western coast of Africa. It occurs in encrusting clumps on rocks and is common under ledges and boulders, on pilings and on wrecks. It also occurs in deep water and detached clumps sometimes get washed up on shore.

Biology
Reproduction of Astrangia poculata takes place during the summer when eggs and sperm are liberated into the water column and fertilisation takes place. The embryos hatch into planula larvae which drift with the plankton before settling to the seabed and undergoing metamorphosis into polyps. Among zooxanthelate organisms, A. poculata is one of the few to have been studied with regard to the acquisition of zooxanthellae. It was found that there was no routine transfer of these symbionts from parent to offspring.

The polyps spread their tentacles to feed, gathering plankton and other food particles from the water passing by. The colony grows by budding, and in favourable conditions, the clump can grow at the rate of one new polyp every three days. In colder conditions it may stop growing and the coenosarc (soft tissues) may die back to some extent  or lose symbionts via expulsion, rendering the stony skeleton prone to being fouled by other organisms  and undergoing a winter quiescence. The base often hosts various boring or burrowing commensal invertebrates. Both temperature and symbiosis are known to influence the condition of the coral host, specifically with regards to wound-healing ability, but it is primarily season that drives microbiome structure in Rhode Island populations of the coral.

References 

Rhizangiidae
Corals described in 1786